Belgium selected their Junior Eurovision entry for 2011 through Junior Eurosong, a national selection consisting of 8 songs, paired in four semi finals. From each semifinal, one song advanced to the final. The national representative, Femke, was selected on September 30.

Before Junior Eurovision

Junior Eurosong 
Belgium selected their Junior Eurovision Song Contest entry for 2011 through Junior Eurosong, a national selection consisting of 8 songs. 

Before the final, four semi-finals were held with two songs each. A three-member jury panel consisting of Miguel Wiels, Tom Dice and Eva Daelemans selected the winning entry of each semi-final to qualify for the final. In the final, the winner was selected via a 50/50 combination of jury voting and public televoting.

Semi-final 1
The first semi-final took place on 26 September 2011. Two of the competing entries performed, and a three-member jury panel selected the winning entry to qualify for the final.

Semi-final 2
The second semi-final took place on 27 September 2011. Two of the competing entries performed, and a three-member jury panel selected the winning entry to qualify for the final.

Semifinal 3
The third semi-final took place on 28 September 2011. Two of the competing entries performed, and a three-member jury panel selected the winning entry to qualify for the final.

Semifinal 4
The fourth semi-final took place on 29 September 2011. Two of the competing entries performed, and a three-member jury panel selected the winning entry to qualify for the final.

Final
The final took place on 30 September 2011. The winner was selected via a 50/50 combination of jury voting and public televoting.

At Junior Eurovision

Voting

Notes

References 

Junior Eurovision Song Contest
Belgium
2011